The 32nd century BC was a century that lasted from the year 3200 BC to 3101 BC.

Events

 c. 3190–3170 BC? reign of King Double Falcon of Lower Egypt. There is a strong possibility that he appears on the Palermo stone, although half his name is chipped away.
 c. 3185–3160 BC? reign of Scorpion I in Upper Egypt.
 c. 3160 In Upper Egypt Thinis annexes Nubt.
 c. 3155–3140 BC? King Iry-Hor reigns from Abydos over most of Egypt.
 c. 3150–3120 BC reign of King Ka in Ancient Egypt.
 c. 3138 BC Ljubljana Marshes Wheel is a wooden wheel that was found in the Ljubljana Marsh in Slovenia. Radiocarbon dating showed that it is approximately 5,150 years old, which makes it the oldest wooden wheel yet discovered.
 c. 3120–3110 BC reign of Scorpion II in Upper Egypt.
 c. 3110 BC beginning of the reign of Narmer, first pharaoh to unify Ancient Egypt and founder of the 1st Dynasty.
 c. 3102 BC beginning of Kali Yuga at midnight (00:00) on 18 February
 c. 3100 BC: The earliest phase of Stonehenge construction begins.
 c. 3100 BC?: Varna Necropolis: what have been claimed to be the earliest-known worked gold artifacts are manufactured
 c. 3100 BC?: Malta: Construction of the Ħaġar Qim megalithic temples, featuring both solar and lunar alignments. "Tarxien period" of megalithic temple construction reaches its apex
 c. 3100 BC?: Sumerian cuneiform writing system
 c. 3100 BC?: Ancient Egypt: Earliest known Egyptian hieroglyphs, beginning of the Early Dynastic Period of Egypt, Horus was the main god worshiped in Upper Egypt, Neith was the main god worshiped in Lower Egypt
 c. 3100 BC?: Crete: Rise of Minoan civilization
 c. 3100 BC?: Ötzi: The final years of the Iceman's life
 c. 3100 BC?: Neolithic settlement built at Skara Brae in the Orkney Islands, Scotland (pictured)
 c. 3100 BC?: Earliest buildings at the Ness of Brodgar in the Orkney Islands constructed.
 c. 3100 BC?: New Stone Age people in Ireland build the 250,000-ton (230,000-tonne) Newgrange solar-oriented passage tomb

Calendar epochs
3114 BC: According to the most widely accepted correlations between the Western calendar and the calendar systems of pre-Columbian Mesoamerica, the mythical starting point of the Mesoamerican Long Count calendar cycle occurs in this year. The Long Count calendar, used and refined most notably by the Maya civilization but also attested in some other (earlier) Mesoamerican cultures, consisted of a series of interlocked cycles or periods of day-counts, which mapped out a linear sequence of days from a notional starting point. The system originated sometime in the Mid- to Late Preclassic period of Mesoamerican chronology, during the latter half of the 1st millennium BC. The starting point of the most commonly used highest-order cycle—the b'ak'tun-cycle consisting of thirteen b'ak'tuns of 144,000 days each—was projected back to an earlier, mythical date. This date is equivalent to 11 August 3114 BC in the proleptic Gregorian calendar (or 6 September in the proleptic Julian calendar), using the correlation known as the "Goodman-Martínez-Thompson (GMT) correlation". The GMT-correlation is worked out with the Long Count starting date equivalent to the Julian Day Number (JDN) equal to 584283, and is accepted by most Mayanist scholars as providing the best fit with the ethnohistorical data. Two succeeding dates, the 12th and 13 August (Gregorian) have also been supported, with the 13th (JDN = 584285, the "astronomical" or "Lounsbury" correlation) attracting significant support as according better with astronomical observational data. Although it is still contended which of these three dates forms the actual starting base of the Long Count, the correlation to one of this triad of dates is definitively accepted by almost all contemporary Mayanists. All other earlier or later correlation proposals are now discounted. The end of the thirteenth baktun was either on December 21 or 23 of 2012 (supposed end of the world).
 3102 BC: The beginning of Kali Yuga as per Hindu calendar.

Notes

References
 
 
 
 
 
 

 

 
-8
-68